The false garden mantis (Pseudomantis albofimbriata) is a species of praying mantis in the family Mantidae,  and was first described in 1860 by Carl Stål as Mantis albofimbriata.  Females reach 70 mm while males reach 50 mm.

Identification/distribution 
The false garden mantis is either green or brown but rarely may come in other colours.

They have a distinctive dark spot on the femur of each raptorial foreleg. Females have short wings that only cover half of the abdomen, whereas males have wings that cover the full length of the abdomen. Males sometimes have yellow triangular markings on the underside of the abdomen. They are found in New South Wales and Queensland.

Behaviour 
The false garden mantis is not aggressive to humans. Females cannot fly due to their very reduced wings but the flying male is long winged and is not as big as the female.

See also
List of mantis genera and species

References

Mantidae
Mantodea of Oceania
Insects of Australia
Insects described in 1860